Francis Joseph Walmsley   (9 November 1926 – 26 December 2017) was an English prelate of the Catholic Church. He served as the Bishop of the Forces from 1979 to 2002.

Born in Woolwich on 9 November 1926, he was ordained to the priesthood on 30 May 1953. He was appointed the Bishop of the Forces and Titular Bishop of  Tamalluma  by the Holy See on 8 January 1979. His consecration to the Episcopate took place on 22 February 1979, the principal consecrator was Bishop Gerard Tickle, retired Bishop of the Forces, and the principal co-consecrators were Bishop Mario Conti of Aberdeen (later Archbishop of Glasgow) and Archbishop Michael Bowen of Southwark. During his term the military vicariate of the British Forces was raised to the status of a military ordinariate on 21 July 1986.

He resigned as Titular Bishop of Tamalluma on 7 March 1998 and retired as Bishop of the Forces on 24 May 2002. He died on Boxing Day 2017 in Reading, and is buried in the grounds of St Michael's Abbey, Farnborough.

References

1926 births
2017 deaths
20th-century Roman Catholic bishops in England
21st-century Roman Catholic bishops in England
People from Woolwich
Commanders of the Order of the British Empire
Roman Catholic bishops of the Forces